London Buses route 343 is a Transport for London contracted bus route in London, England. Running between New Cross Gate and Aldgate, it is operated by London Central.

History

When re-tendered, the route passed to Travel London's Walworth garage on 21 September 2005 with Wright Eclipse Gemini bodied Volvo B7TLs introduced. 

Route 343 was included in the May 2009 sale of Travel London to Abellio London. Abellio London successfully tendered to retain the route with a new contract commencing on 5 May 2011.

In June 2010, the route was revealed to be amongst the ten worst performing in London. Two additional morning peak journeys were introduced on 12 June 2010 with the intention of solving the problems; performance improved as a result, although the route continued to receive complaints.

A proposal to increase the frequency of the route was announced by Transport for London in November 2010.

At 08:22 on 17 March 2012, a route 343 caught fire on Pepys Road, New Cross. The fire was put out by 09:20 and there were no injuries.

On 25 June 2019, the route received an extension from City Hall to Aldgate to replace part of the now withdrawn RV1.

Current route
Route 343 operates via these primary locations:
New Cross Gate Jerningham Road
Brockley
Peckham Rye station  
Elephant & Castle station  
Borough station 
London Bridge station  
St Thomas Street for Guy's Hospital
City Hall Queen Elizabeth Street
 Tower Gateway station   
 Aldgate station

References

External links

Bus routes in London
Transport in the London Borough of Lewisham
Transport in the London Borough of Southwark